Philippe Kourouma (29 November 1932, in Samoé – 10 February 2009) was the Guinean bishop of the Roman Catholic Diocese of N’Zérékoré from 15 December 1979, until his retirement on 27 November 2007. He remained Bishop Emeritus of the diocese from his retirement until his death on 10 February 2009, at the age of 76.

References

External links 
Catholic Hierarchy: Bishop Philippe Kourouma †

1932 births
2009 deaths
20th-century Roman Catholic bishops in Guinea
21st-century Roman Catholic bishops in Guinea
Guinean Roman Catholic bishops
Roman Catholic bishops of N'Zérékoré